Antrim and Newtownabbey Borough Council is a local authority that was established on 1 April 2015. It replaces Antrim Borough Council and Newtownabbey Borough Council. A statutory transition committee was established in 2013 to prepare for the merger. The first elections to the authority were on 22 May 2014 with 73 candidates standing for 40 seats.  The authority acted in shadow form until the formal creation of the Antrim and Newtownabbey district on 1 April 2015.

Transition committee
The statutory transition committee was established in 2013 with a membership of eight councillors each from Antrim Borough Council and Newtownabbey Borough Council. The purpose of the committee was to ensure that the new council would be ready to operate from 1 April 2015; to plan for the period up to and after the election of the shadow council; to arrange the first meeting of the shadow council; and to appoint a chief executive.

Borough status
A new local government district was created on 1 April 2015 and is formally called the Antrim and Newtownabbey District, while the council is the Antrim and Newtownabbey District Council. Both of the previous authorities merged into it had borough status, which entitled them to be known as borough councils and the districts to be known as boroughs. The 2013 corporate plan of the statutory transition committee indicated that the new council was expected to retain this status.

Mayoralty

Mayor

Deputy Mayor

Councillors
For the purpose of elections the council is divided into seven district electoral areas (DEAs).

Seat summary

Councillors by electoral area
This list reflects the order in which councillors were elected on 2 May 2019.

† Co-opted to fill a vacancy since the election.‡ New party affiliation since the election.Last updated 19 June 2022.

For further details see 2019 Antrim and Newtownabbey Borough Council election.

Population
The area covered by the new Council had a population of 138,567 residents according to the 2011 Northern Ireland census.

The population of Antrim and Newtownabbey was 145,661 at the time of the 2021 Census.  An increase of 5.1% since the 2011 Census.

Christmas in the Borough
In September 2018 the council cancelled the Christmas tree and lights switch on for the town of Crumlin. The move, to reduce the budget allocation for Christmas across the borough, was the result of a rate reduction for Belfast International Airport, Aldergrove, to the tune of £1,000,000. Crumlin was to be the only town in the borough without a Christmas tree or lights in 2018, and the only town in Northern Ireland without council funding for Christmas. The initial proposals on Christmas funding came before the council in November 2017, when an amendment to the motion was moved to include Crumlin, but the vote was tied at 18-18, and the Mayor used his casting vote against it.

However, a number of Christmas events took place across the Borough in 2018. Community groups received funding from the council to organise Christmas switch on events, and there were street markets at the switch on events at Antrim, Ballyclare, Glengormley, and Randalstown.

The Enchanted Winter Garden returned to Antrim Castle's Gardens from 7 to 17 December. An Evening of Inclusive Enchantment was planned for 18 December, with reduced numbers, lighting, and sound levels, a sensory and quiet room, ideal for children and adults with additional needs.

See also 
 Local government in Northern Ireland
 2014 Northern Ireland local elections
 Political make-up of local councils in the United Kingdom

References

External links 
 

District councils of Northern Ireland
Politics of County Antrim